Pisay is a 2007 Filipino drama film directed by Auraeus Solito, written by Henry Grajeda and starring Gammy Lopez, Annicka Dolonius, Carl John Barrameda, and Elijah Castillo. The film, set in the 1980s, is centred upon a young student, from 1982 as a freshman and ending in 1986. The background is the last years of Martial Law in the Philippines where the Marcos dictatorship was at its peak.

Plot 
The show revolves around Rom Meneses (Gammy Lopez), a young student who enters the premier Philippine Science High School (Tagalog: Mataas na Paaralan ng Plipinas sa Agham; or commonly known as Pisay) along with seven other students during the politically volatile years of the Philippines in the '80s. The students are guided by their teacher Ms. Casas (Eugene Domingo), as they discover the world outside the four corners of the school and the chaos of the Marcos dictatorship.

Cast 
 Gammy Lopez as Rom Meneses
 Annicka Dolonius as Wena Ledesma
 Carl John Barrameda as Mateo Markado
 Elijah Castillo as Minggoy Lamazan 
 Shayne Fajutagana as Liway Claver 
 Jonathan Neri as Andy Gallardo
 EJ Jallorina as Euri Calo 
 Alfred Labatos as Daki Lim
 Eugene Domingo as Ms. Casas
 Arnold Reyes as Mr. G
 Rowena Basco as Ms. Fanny
 Glecy Atienza as Dra. Claver

Release 
The film was released on February 20, 2008, in the Philippines and was also shown in Canada, South Korea, Germany, France and Singapore at different film festivals.

Awards 
Pisay won awards for Best Director, Best Production Design, and Audience Choice Awards at the 2008 Cinemalaya Philippine Independent Film Festival. Internationally, it won the Audience Award and International Jury Prize at the 2008 Vesoul Asian Film Festival.

References 

2008 films
2008 drama films
Philippine independent films
Philippine New Wave
2000s Tagalog-language films